is a train station in the city of Ena, Gifu Prefecture, Japan, operated by the third-sector railway operator Akechi Railway.

Lines

Station layout
Gokuraku Station has one side platform serving a single bi-directional track. The station is unattended.

Adjacent stations

|-
!colspan=5|Akechi Railway

History
Gokuraku Station opened on December 25, 2008.

Surrounding area

See also
 List of Railway Stations in Japan

References 

  History of the railway company on its official Japanese website, mentioning the opening of Gokuraku Station in December 2008 at the bottom of the table.
  A Japanese news article regarding the opening of the station, released by a major newspaper company.

External links

 

Railway stations in Gifu Prefecture
Railway stations in Japan opened in 2008
Stations of Akechi Railway
Ena, Gifu